The men's singles was one of four events of the tennis program at the 2009 Games of the Small States of Europe in Cyprus.

Medalists

Seeds
 Jean-René Lisnard (champion, gold medalist)
 Stefano Galvani (semifinals, bronze medalist)
 Benjamin Balleret (final, silver medalist)
 Photos Kallias (second round)

Draw

References
 Men's Singles Draw

Men's singles